Beecher Community Unit School District 200U is a south suburbs of Chicago, Illinois

, the school district had 1046 students and 62 full-time equivalent teacher employment, for a teacher-student ratio of 21:1, and operational expenses were $12,521 per student.

 Beecher Elementary School
 Beecher Junior High School
 Beecher High School

References

External links
 Beecher Community Unit School District 200U — official site
 Illinois Report Card: Beeacher CUSD 200U from the Illinois State Board of Education

School districts in Will County, Illinois